Ulla Zirne (born 6 August 1995) is a Latvian luger. She was born in Riga. She competed at the 2014 Winter Olympics in Sochi, in  women's singles.

References

External links
 

1995 births
Living people
Lugers at the 2014 Winter Olympics
Lugers at the 2018 Winter Olympics
Latvian female lugers
Olympic lugers of Latvia
Lugers at the 2012 Winter Youth Olympics
Sportspeople from Riga